Johns Creek is a  stream in the U.S. state of Georgia. It is a tributary of the Oostanaula River and was named in honor of John Fields, a local Cherokee Indian.

Course
Johns Creek originates on the eastern slope of Johns Mountain in Walker County. From there, the stream flows south through the Chattahoochee-Oconee National Forest into Floyd County. South of the Floyd-Gordon county line, Johns Creek is joined by Pocket Creek and briefly flows west for about  before turning south again. From there, the stream passes by Everett Springs.

South of the national forest, Johns Creek forms the boundary between Floyd and Gordon counties, passing under Georgia State Route 156. Eventually, the stream empties into the Oostanaula River.

Fishing
Rainbow trout is present on Johns Creek through fish stocking. Redeye bass is another species present on the stream.

See also
List of rivers of Georgia (U.S. state)

References

Rivers of Floyd County, Georgia
Rivers of Gordon County, Georgia
Rivers of Walker County, Georgia
Rivers of Georgia (U.S. state)